Thomas Patrick Gilman (born May 28, 1994) is an American freestyle wrestler and graduated folkstyle wrestler who competes at 57 kilograms. In freestyle, Gilman is a 2020 Tokyo Olympic bronze medalist and the 2021 World Champion (finalist in 2017 and 2022) and Pan American Continental champion. In folkstyle, Gilman was a three–time NCAA Division I All-American, the 2016 NCAA national runner–up, and a Big Ten Conference champion out of the University of Iowa.

Folkstyle career

Early life 
Born and raised in Iowa to Patrick and Cheri Gilman, Thomas moved to Nebraska to attend Skutt Catholic High School in Omaha. As a high school wrestler, Gilman went on to become the twentieth four-time Nebraska (NSAA) state champion in history and helped the team reach three state titles. He also won the 2009 NHSCA National title at 103 pounds as a freshman.

As a senior ('11–'12), Gilman committed to Terry Brands and the Iowa Hawkeyes as the top-recruit in the state of Nebraska.

College 
While redshirting ('12–'13), Gilman compiled 23 wins (14 of them with bonus points) and 5 losses, two Open tournament titles and ended up the season on a seven match win-streak. As a freshman ('13–'14), he racked up a 16–3 mark, including 7 victories and 2 losses in dual meets and a Midlands title, where he recorded wins over defending NCAA champion Jesse Delgado and three-time ACC champion Jarrod Garnett. However, he was not the starter at 125 pounds for the post-season tournaments (NCAAs and B1Gs) after being defeated by his teammate Cory Clark in a wrestle-off for the spot.

As a sophomore ('14–'15), he compiled 31 wins and 6 losses, a 15–2 record in dual meets, a perfect 9–0 in Big Ten duals and Midlands runner-up honors. In the post-season, he claimed runner-up honors at the Big Ten Championships to Buckeyes' Nathan Tomasello and became an All-American with a fourth place finish at the NCAA's.

As a junior ('15–'16), Gilman kept on improving his W/L ratio with a 28–2 record, with a perfect 17–0 mark in dual meets. His first loss came at the Big Ten Championship semifinals and was handed by two-time NCAA National runner-up Nico Megaludis, and came back to claim third-place at the tournament. At the NCAA championships, he dominantly reached the finale with two majors, one technical fall and a pin over the defending NCAA champion Nathan Tomasello, while also avenging his last season's loss. In the finals, Gilman was once again downed by Nico Megaludis from PSU, claiming runner-up honors.

In his final year ('16–'17), Gilman compiled 32 wins and just one loss, with a 15–0 mark at dual meets. He led the Hawkeyes on falls and technical falls, scored bonus points in 26 out of 32 wins and won the Midland Championships, being named the Outstanding Wrestler as well. After being the top–ranked 125 pounder in the country throughout the whole season, Gilman claimed his first Big Ten title by topping Timothy Lambert from Nebraska in the finals. As the top–seed at the NCAA's, Gilman was on a dominant with two majors and a fall over rival Nick Piccininni to make the semifinals, but was defeated by the eventual winner of the championship Darian Cruz, getting thrown to the consolation side of the bracket. He came back with a victory over second-seeded Joey Dance and once again downed Nick Piccininni, now 13–6 to claim third place. Gilman graduated with 107 wins and 12 losses.

Freestyle career

Age–group level 
In the age–group, Gilman was a three–time US World Team Member, once as a cadet and twice as a junior, and went on to claim a bronze medal from the Junior World Championships in 2014.

Senior level

2013 
Gilman made his senior level debut at the US University Nationals at age 18, where he placed third.

2017 
After his folkstyle career was over, Gilman competed at the US Last Chance World Team Trials Qualifier in May, and went on to place first to earn a spot at the US World Team Trials. At the US World Team Trials Challenge Tournament of June, Gilman went on to defeat 2017 NCAA champion Darian Cruz, reigning Pan American champion Tyler Graff, two–time US University National champion Nico Megaludis and 2015 NCAA champion Nathan Tomasello, to make the best–of–three final. In the best–of–three, Gilman went on to defeat fellow graduated Hawkeye Tony Ramos twice in a row to become the biggest underdog to make the 2017 US World Team. Gilman then went on to claim the prestigious Grand Prix of Spain in July.

At the 2017 World Championships, Gilman opened up with big wins over 2016 European Continental runner–up and two–time Cadet World Champion from Ukraine Andriy Yatsenko and 2017 Asian Continental medalist from Iran Reza Atri, before defeating 2017 Dave Schultz Memorial runner–up Nodirjon Safarov and stunning 2014 Asian Games Gold medalist from North–Korea Jong Hak-jin to astonishingly making the finals of the tournament. In the finale, Gilman's 15 match win–streak was broken by 2017 Asian Continental champion from Japan Yuki Takahashi, claiming the 2017 World Championship Silver medal. To cap off the year, Gilman helped Titan Mercury Wrestling Club reach second–place at the Clubs World Championship.

2018 
Gilman started off the year by helping Team USA reach the gold medal at the World Cup, going 2–2. He then claimed a bronze medal from the Pan American Championships, after falling to 2017 U23 World Champion from Cuba Reineri Andreu in the semifinals and bouncing back in the third–place match. In June, the defending US World Team Member was able to defeat Junior World Champion Daton Fix twice in a row at Final X Lincoln to make back–to–back teams. In July, he claimed the prestigious Yasar Dogu International title, defeating Süleyman Atlı in the process. At the 2018 World Championships, Gilman went on to defeat Italy's Givi Davidovi and Azerbaijan's three–time and reigning European Continental champion Giorgi Edisherashvili, before being defeated by 2018 Asian Continental champion (61kg) from Kazakhstan Nurislam Sanayev and Süleyman Atlı to place fifth.

2019–2020 
Gilman started off the year competing overseas, claiming an Ivan Yarygin Golden Grand Prix bronze medal and placing 15th at the Dan Kolov – Nikola Petrov Memorial. After coming back to the United States, Gilman claimed runner–up honors from the US Open, losing to Daton Fix in the finals but not before beating Nathan Tomasello. In May, he claimed the US World Team Trials Challenge by defeating Darian Cruz twice, becoming the Final X challenger. At June's Final X, Gilman was defeated by Fix two to one, losing the chance of representing the United States at the World Championships. Gilman then travelled to Russia to train in Vladikavkaz, and was named the USA Wrestling Athlete of the Week after claiming the Yusup Abdusalamov Memorial. He also competed at the Intercontinental Cup and the Alans International, placing third at twelfth respectively before returning to the United States.

Gilman opened up 2020 with a prestigious Matteo Pellicone Ranking Series title, defeating Daton Fix in the semifinals and 2019 World Championship medalist (61 kg) Joe Colon in the semifinals and finals. Gilman then continued his streak two months later, and qualified the weight for the United States to compete at the 2020 Summer Olympics after winning the gold medal from the Pan American Olympic Qualification Tournament, notably defeating two–time U23 World Champion from Cuba Reineri Andreu in the semifinals. Gilman was then scheduled to compete at the 2020 US Olympic Team Trials in April, however, the event was postponed as well as the 2020 Summer Olympics due to the COVID-19 outbreak. In April 10, Gilman announced his move from his long–time club, the Hawkeye Wrestling Club, to the Nittany Lion Wrestling Club in State College, Pennsylvania.

After being unable to compete for months due to the pandemic, Gilman competed at his now local NLWC in their first event in September, where he tech'd NCAA champion Darian Cruz. In their third event, in November, Gilman pinned 2017 Ukrainian International Open runner–up Frank Perrelli, notably calling out Spencer Lee afterwards. In his last event of the year, Gilman was unable to keep his unbeaten streak and was defeated by 2019 Bill Farrell Memorial champion Seth Gross via criteria in December.

2021 
To open up the year, Gilman competed at the Grand Prix de France Henri Deglane in January, where after downing three–time European Continental champion Giorgi Edisherashvili and 2020 US National champion Vito Arujau in his first two matches, he was controversially defeated by Islam Bazarganov on criteria, but was able to defeat Edisherashvili in the third–place match to claim bronze. In February, he competed at the fifth NLWC event, and was upset by Zach Sanders, before defeating Sean Russell. In April 2–3, Gilman, the top–seed, competed at the rescheduled 2020 US Olympic Team Trials in an attempt to represent the United States at the 2020 Summer Olympics. To make it to the best–of–three, he ran through two–time All–American Zane Richards and World Championship medalist Joe Colon, ending both via technical fall. Gilman then wrestled Vito Arujau (21–2 since the pandemic, took out Daton Fix in the semifinals), and went on to pin him in the first match and beat him via criteria in the second match. This result qualified Gilman to represent the United States at the 2020 Summer Olympics, and he is expected to do so in August 4–5. He was also expected to compete at the Pan American Continental Championships, but was forced out due to a foot injury and was replaced by Arujau.

On August 4, Gilman competed in the first date of the men's freestyle 57 kg of the 2020 Summer Olympics, where he went the distance in a razor-close loss to eventual winner of the Olympic Games and two-time and reigning World Champion Zaur Uguev from the Russian Olympic Committee. As the Russian kept advancing on the bracket, Gilman was pulled into repechage to compete on August 5, dominating Gulomjon Abdullaev from Uzbekistan and '19 Asian champion Reza Atri from Iran in order to capture the bronze medal for the United States.

As an Olympic medalist, Gilman earned the right to automatically represent the United States at the 2021 World Championships without having to compete domestically to make the US World Team, and did so from October 3 to 4. Gilman had a dominant run on the first date, bulldozing through '21 Russian National medalist Abubakar Mutaliev and European Continental medalists Vladimir Egorov and Horst Lehr to make his second World finale. Different from his 2017 finals, Gilman emerged victorious over '21 Asian Continental finalist Alireza Sarlak on October 4 in order to acclaim the World Championship, becoming the first 57 kilogram American competitor to do so.

2022 
Back from becoming a World Champion, Gilman defeated familiar foe and NCAA champion Darian Cruz eleven points to zero on February 12, at Bout at the Ballpark. On May 8, he became the Pan American Continental champion, downing Cruz again for the title. Gilman claimed the spot to represent his country at the 2022 World Championships for the fourth time in his career, taking out Vito Arujau twice in a row at Final X Stillwater. In July 18, he claimed gold at the Tunis Ranking Series, despite losing to 2021 World medalist Horst Lehr.

After cruising to the finals with not much trouble, Gilman was downed by Zelimkhan Abakarov on September 17 at the 2022 World Championships, earning a silver medal in his third World finals match.

Wrestling style 
Gilman will usually try to be as physical as possible, controlling the center with his strength and walking down and pushing his opponent while overwhelming him with heavy hand fighting until a takedown opportunity opens up. Due to his aggressiveness, Gilman is considered to have the traditional Iowa style and is often described as "tough" and a "brawler".

Freestyle record

! colspan="7"| Senior Freestyle Matches
|-
!  Res.
!  Record
!  Opponent
!  Score
!  Date
!  Event
!  Location
|-
! style=background:white colspan=7 |
|-
|Loss
|91–21
|align=left| Zelimkhan Abakarov
|style="font-size:88%"|2–7
|style="font-size:88%"|September 17, 2022
|style="font-size:88%" rowspan=4|2022 World Championships
|style="text-align:left;font-size:88%;" rowspan=4| Belgrade, Serbia
|-
|Win
|91–20
|align=left| Zou Wanhao
|style="font-size:88%"|8–2
|style="font-size:88%" rowspan=3|September 16, 2022
|-
|Win
|90–20
|align=left| Zandanbudyn Zanabazar
|style="font-size:88%"|5–1
|-
|Win
|89–20
|align=left| Georgii Okorokov
|style="font-size:88%"|TF 11–0
|-
! style=background:white colspan=7 |
|-
|Win
|88–20
|align=left| Udit Udit
|style="font-size:88%"|9–8
|style="font-size:88%" rowspan=4|July 18, 2022
|style="font-size:88%" rowspan=4|2022 Tunis Ranking Series
|style="text-align:left;font-size:88%;" rowspan=4| Tunis, Tunisia
|-
|Win
|87–20
|align=left| Alireza Sarlak
|style="font-size:88%"|11–7
|-
|Win
|86–20
|align=left| Nodirjon Safarov
|style="font-size:88%"|TF 11–1
|-
|Loss
|85–20
|align=left| Horst Lehr
|style="font-size:88%"|Fall
|-
! style=background:white colspan=7 |
|-
|Win
|85–19
|align=left| Vito Arujau
|style="font-size:88%"|TF 14–2
|style="font-size:88%" rowspan=2|June 3, 2022
|style="font-size:88%" rowspan=2|2022 Final X: Stillwater
|style="text-align:left;font-size:88%;" rowspan=2| Stillwater, Oklahoma
|-
|Win
|84–19
|align=left| Vito Arujau
|style="font-size:88%"|TF 12–2
|-
! style=background:white colspan=7 |
|-
|Win
|83–19
|align=left| Darian Cruz
|style="font-size:88%"|TF 11–0
|style="font-size:88%" rowspan=3|May 8, 2022
|style="font-size:88%" rowspan=3|2022 Pan American Continental Championships
|style="text-align:left;font-size:88%;" rowspan=3| Acapulco, Mexico
|-
|Win
|82–19
|align=left| Alexei Alvarez Blanco
|style="font-size:88%"|Fall
|-
|Win
|81–19
|align=left| Enrique Herrera
|style="font-size:88%"|Fall
|-
|Win
|80–19
|align=left| Darian Cruz
|style="font-size:88%"|TF 11–0
|style="font-size:88%"|February 12, 2022
|style="font-size:88%"|2022 Bout at the Ballpark
|style="text-align:left;font-size:88%;"|
 Arlington, Texas
|-
! style=background:white colspan=7 |
|-
|Win
|79–19
|align=left| Alireza Sarlak
|style="font-size:88%"|5–3
|style="font-size:88%"|October 4, 2021
|style="font-size:88%" rowspan=4|2021 World Championships
|style="text-align:left;font-size:88%;" rowspan=4| Oslo, Norway
|-
|Win
|78–19
|align=left| Horst Lehr
|style="font-size:88%"|TF 15–5
|style="font-size:88%" rowspan=3|October 3, 2021
|-
|Win
|77–19
|align=left| Vladimir Egorov
|style="font-size:88%"|TF 11–0
|-
|Win
|76–19
|align=left| Abubakar Mutaliev
|style="font-size:88%"|Fall
|-
! style=background:white colspan=7 |
|-
|Win
|75–19
|align=left| Reza Atri
|style="font-size:88%"|9–1
|style="font-size:88%" rowspan=3|August 4–5, 2021
|style="font-size:88%" rowspan=3|2020 Summer Olympics
|style="text-align:left;font-size:88%;" rowspan=3| Tokyo, Japan
|-
|Win
|74–19
|align=left| Gulomjon Abdullaev
|style="font-size:88%"|TF 11–1
|-
|Loss
|73–19
|align=left| Zaur Uguev
|style="font-size:88%"|4–5
|-
! style=background:white colspan=7 |
|-
|Win
|73–18
|align=left| Vito Arujau
|style="font-size:88%"|2–2
|style="font-size:88%" rowspan=4|April 2–3, 2021
|style="font-size:88%" rowspan=4|2020 US Olympic Team Trials
|style="text-align:left;font-size:88%;" rowspan=4| Forth Worth, Texas
|-
|Win
|72–18
|align=left| Vito Arujau
|style="font-size:88%"|Fall
|-
|Win
|71–18
|align=left| Joe Colon
|style="font-size:88%"|TF 10–0
|-
|Win
|70–18
|align=left| Zane Richards
|style="font-size:88%"|TF 11–0
|-
|Win
|69–18
|align=left| Sean Russell
|style="font-size:88%"|TF 11–0
|style="font-size:88%" rowspan=2|February 23, 2021
|style="font-size:88%" rowspan=2|NLWC V
|style="text-align:left;font-size:88%;" rowspan=2|
 State College, Pennsylvania
|-
|Loss
|68–18
|align=left| Zach Sanders
|style="font-size:88%"|Fall
|-
! style=background:white colspan=7 |
|-
|Win
|68–17
|align=left| Giorgi Edisherashvili
|style="font-size:88%"|6–4
|style="font-size:88%" rowspan=4|January 16, 2021
|style="font-size:88%" rowspan=4|Grand Prix de France Henri Deglane 2021
|style="text-align:left;font-size:88%;" rowspan=4|
 Nice, France
|-
|Loss
|67–17
|align=left| Islam Bazarganov
|style="font-size:88%"|6–6
|-
|Win
|67–16
|align=left| Vito Arujau
|style="font-size:88%"|6–2
|-
|Win
|66–16
|align=left| Giorgi Edisherashvili
|style="font-size:88%"|4–0
|-
|Loss
|65–16
|align=left| Seth Gross
|style="font-size:88%"|4–4
|style="font-size:88%"|December 16, 2020
|style="font-size:88%"|WRTC II
|style="text-align:left;font-size:88%;"|
 Wisconsin
|-
|Win
|65–15
|align=left| Frank Perrelli
|style="font-size:88%"|Fall
|style="font-size:88%"|November 24, 2020
|style="font-size:88%"|NLWC III
|style="text-align:left;font-size:88%;"|
 State College, Pennsylvania
|-
|Win
|64–15
|align=left| Darian Cruz
|style="font-size:88%"|TF 14–4
|style="font-size:88%"|September 19, 2020
|style="font-size:88%"|NLWC I
|style="text-align:left;font-size:88%;"|
 State College, Pennsylvania
|-
! style=background:white colspan=7 |
|-
|Win
|63–15
|align=left| Óscar Tigreros
|style="font-size:88%"|FF
|style="font-size:88%" rowspan=4|March 13–15, 2020
|style="font-size:88%" rowspan=4|2020 Pan American Olympic Qualification Tournament
|style="text-align:left;font-size:88%;" rowspan=4|
 Ottawa, Canada
|-
|Win
|62–15
|align=left| Juan Rubelin Ramirez Beltre
|style="font-size:88%"|TF 11–0
|-
|Win
|61–15
|align=left| Reineri Andreu
|style="font-size:88%"|4–3
|-
|Win
|60–15
|align=left| Ligrit Sadiku
|style="font-size:88%"|TF 10–0
|-
! style=background:white colspan=7 |
|-
|Win
|59–15
|align=left| Joe Colon
|style="font-size:88%"|4–3
|style="font-size:88%" rowspan=4|January 15–18, 2020
|style="font-size:88%" rowspan=4|Matteo Pellicone Ranking Series 2020
|style="text-align:left;font-size:88%;" rowspan=4|
 Rome, Italy
|-
|Win
|58–15
|align=left| Daton Fix
|style="font-size:88%"|2–1
|-
|Win
|57–15
|align=left| Minghu Liu
|style="font-size:88%"|12–4
|-
|Win
|56–15
|align=left| Gabit Tolepbay
|style="font-size:88%"|TF 11–0
|-
! style=background:white colspan=7 |
|-
|Loss
|55–15
|align=left| Abubakar Mutaliev
|style="font-size:88%"|1–2
|style="font-size:88%" rowspan=2|December 7–8, 2019
|style="font-size:88%" rowspan=2|2019 Alans International Tournament
|style="text-align:left;font-size:88%;" rowspan=2|
 Vladikavkaz, North Ossetia–Alania
|-
|Win
|55–14
|align=left| Shamil Suleymanov
|style="font-size:88%"|TF 13–3
|-
! style=background:white colspan=7 |
|-
|Win
|54–14
|align=left| Salikh Muradov
|style="font-size:88%"|6–0
|style="font-size:88%" rowspan=2|October 19–14, 2019
|style="font-size:88%" rowspan=2|2019 Intercontinental Cup
|style="text-align:left;font-size:88%;" rowspan=2|
 Khasavyurt, Dagestan
|-
|Loss
|53–14
|align=left| Abubakar Mutaliev
|style="font-size:88%"|8–10
|-
! style=background:white colspan=7 |
|-
|Win
|53–13
|align=left| Salikh Muradov
|style="font-size:88%"|
|style="font-size:88%" rowspan=5|October 5, 2019
|style="font-size:88%" rowspan=5|2019 Yusup Abdusalamov International
|style="text-align:left;font-size:88%;" rowspan=5|
 Botlikh, Dagestan
|-
|Win
|52–13
|align=left|
|style="font-size:88%"|
|-
|Win
|51–13
|align=left|
|style="font-size:88%"|
|-
|Win
|50–13
|align=left|
|style="font-size:88%"|
|-
|Win
|49–13
|align=left|
|style="font-size:88%"|
|-
! style=background:white colspan=7 |
|-
|Loss
|48–13
|align=left| Daton Fix
|style="font-size:88%"|3–6
|style="font-size:88%" rowspan=3|June 14–15, 2019
|style="font-size:88%" rowspan=3|2019 US World Team Trials
|style="text-align:left;font-size:88%;" rowspan=3| Lincoln, Nebraska
|-
|Win
|48–12
|align=left| Daton Fix
|style="font-size:88%"|3–2
|-
|Loss
|47–12
|align=left| Daton Fix
|style="font-size:88%"|1–9
|-
|Win
|47–11
|align=left| Darian Cruz
|style="font-size:88%"|5–2
|style="font-size:88%" rowspan=3|May 17–19, 2019
|style="font-size:88%" rowspan=3|2019 US World Team Trials Challenge
|style="text-align:left;font-size:88%;" rowspan=3| Raleigh, North Carolina
|-
|Win
|46–11
|align=left| Darian Cruz
|style="font-size:88%"|4–0
|-
|Win
|45–11
|align=left| Frank Perrelli
|style="font-size:88%"|TF 10–0
|-
! style=background:white colspan=7 |
|-
|Loss
|44–11
|align=left| Daton Fix
|style="font-size:88%"|4–8
|style="font-size:88%" rowspan=5|April 24–27, 2019
|style="font-size:88%" rowspan=5|2019 US Open National Championships
|style="text-align:left;font-size:88%;" rowspan=5|
 Las Vegas, Nevada
|-
|Win
|44–10
|align=left| Nathan Tomasello
|style="font-size:88%"|DQ (8–0)
|-
|Win
|43–10
|align=left| Zane Richards
|style="font-size:88%"|TF 12–2
|-
|Win
|42–10
|align=left| Gunnar Woodburn
|style="font-size:88%"|TF 11–0
|-
|Win
|41–10
|align=left| Josh Portillo
|style="font-size:88%"|TF 12–2
|-
! style=background:white colspan=7 |
|-
|Loss
|40–10
|align=left| Georgi Vangelov
|style="font-size:88%"|5–6
|style="font-size:88%"|February 28 – March 3, 2019
|style="font-size:88%"|2019 Dan Kolov - Nikola Petrov Memorial
|style="text-align:left;font-size:88%;" |
 Ruse, Bulgaria
|-
! style=background:white colspan=7 |
|-
|Win
|40–9
|align=left| Bekhbayar Erdenebat
|style="font-size:88%"|14–8
|style="font-size:88%" rowspan=4|January 24, 2019
|style="font-size:88%" rowspan=4|Golden Grand Prix Ivan Yarygin 2019
|style="text-align:left;font-size:88%;" rowspan=4|
 Krasnoyarsk, Russia
|-
|Win
|39–9
|align=left| Ahmet Peker
|style="font-size:88%"|9–0
|-
|Loss
|38–9
|align=left| Abasgadzhi Magomedov
|style="font-size:88%"|Fall
|-
|Win
|38–8
|align=left| Alexei Alvarez Blanco
|style="font-size:88%"|TF 10–0
|-
! style=background:white colspan=7 |
|-
|Loss
|37–8
|align=left| Süleyman Atlı
|style="font-size:88%"|4–5
|style="font-size:88%" rowspan=4|October 21–22, 2018
|style="font-size:88%" rowspan=4|2018 World Championships
|style="text-align:left;font-size:88%;" rowspan=4|
 Budapest, Hungary
|-
|Loss
|37–7
|align=left| Nurislam Sanayev
|style="font-size:88%"|TF 0–11
|-
|Win
|37–6
|align=left| Giorgi Edisherashvili
|style="font-size:88%"|4–0
|-
|Win
|36–6
|align=left| Givi Davidovi
|style="font-size:88%"|6–3
|-
! style=background:white colspan=7 |
|-
|Win
|35–6
|align=left| Dzmichyk Rynchynau
|style="font-size:88%"|12–5
|style="font-size:88%" rowspan=4|July 27–29, 2018
|style="font-size:88%" rowspan=4|2018 Yaşar Doğu
|style="text-align:left;font-size:88%;" rowspan=4| Istanbul, Turkey
|-
|Win
|34–6
|align=left| Taras Markovich
|style="font-size:88%"|6–6
|-
|Win
|33–6
|align=left| Süleyman Atlı
|style="font-size:88%"|7–5
|-
|Win
|32–6
|align=left| Berdakh Primbayev
|style="font-size:88%"|11–3
|-
! style=background:white colspan=7 |
|-
|Win
|31–6
|align=left| Daton Fix
|style="font-size:88%"|2–1
|style="font-size:88%" rowspan=2|June 8–9, 2018
|style="font-size:88%" rowspan=2|2018 US World Team Trials
|style="text-align:left;font-size:88%;" rowspan=2| Lincoln, Nebraska
|-
|Win
|30–6
|align=left| Daton Fix
|style="font-size:88%"|6–3
|-
! style=background:white colspan=7 |
|-
|Win
|29–6
|align=left| Pedro Mejías
|style="font-size:88%"|11–4
|style="font-size:88%" rowspan=4|May 3–6, 2018
|style="font-size:88%" rowspan=4|2018 Pan American Continental Championships
|style="text-align:left;font-size:88%;" rowspan=4|
 Lima, Peru
|-
|Loss
|28–6
|align=left| Reineri Andreu
|style="font-size:88%"|4–7
|-
|Win
|28–5
|align=left| Alex Moher
|style="font-size:88%"|TF 10–0
|-
|Win
|27–5
|align=left| Andre Quispé
|style="font-size:88%"|TF 10–0
|-
! style=background:white colspan=7 |
|-
|Loss
|26–5
|align=left| Giorgi Edisherashvili
|style="font-size:88%"|7–8
|style="font-size:88%" rowspan=4|April 7–8, 2018
|style="font-size:88%" rowspan=4|2018 World Cup
|style="text-align:left;font-size:88%;" rowspan=4|
 Iowa City, Iowa
|-
|Win
|26–4
|align=left| Teimuraz Vanishvili
|style="font-size:88%"|6–4
|-
|Loss
|25–4
|align=left| Yuki Takahashi
|style="font-size:88%"|1–4
|-
|Win
|25–3
|align=left| FF
|style="font-size:88%"|FF
|-
! style=background:white colspan=7 |
|-
|Loss
|24–3
|align=left| Reza Atri
|style="font-size:88%"|4–6
|style="font-size:88%" rowspan=5|December 7–8, 2017
|style="font-size:88%" rowspan=5|2017 World Clubs Cup
|style="text-align:left;font-size:88%;" rowspan=5|
 Tehran, Iran
|-
|Win
|24–2
|align=left| Tsogbadarkh Tsveensuren
|style="font-size:88%"|5–2
|-
|Win
|23–2
|align=left| FF
|style="font-size:88%"|FF
|-
|Win
|22–2
|align=left| Amit Kumar Dahiya
|style="font-size:88%"|6–3
|-
|Win
|21–2
|align=left| Steven Takahashi
|style="font-size:88%"|13–6
|-
! style=background:white colspan=7 |
|-
|Loss
|20–2
|align=left| Yuki Takahashi
|style="font-size:88%"|0–6
|style="font-size:88%" rowspan=5|August 25, 2017
|style="font-size:88%" rowspan=5|2017 World Championships
|style="text-align:left;font-size:88%;" rowspan=5|
 Paris, France
|-
|Win
|20–1
|align=left| Jong Hak-jin
|style="font-size:88%"|5–4
|-
|Win
|19–1
|align=left| Nodirjon Safarov
|style="font-size:88%"|TF 12–1
|-
|Win
|18–1
|align=left| Reza Atri
|style="font-size:88%"|3–0
|-
|Win
|17–1
|align=left| Andriy Yatsenko
|style="font-size:88%"|5–2
|-
! style=background:white colspan=7 |
|-
|Win
|16–1
|align=left| Zoheir El Ouarraqe
|style="font-size:88%"|10–2
|style="font-size:88%" rowspan=3|July 15–16, 2017
|style="font-size:88%" rowspan=3|2017 Grand Prix of Spain
|style="text-align:left;font-size:88%;" rowspan=3|
 Madrid, Spain
|-
|Win
|15–1
|align=left| Levan Metreveli
|style="font-size:88%"|TF 15–2
|-
|Win
|14–1
|align=left| Steven Takahashi
|style="font-size:88%"|10–5
|-
! style=background:white colspan=7 |
|-
|Win
|13–1
|align=left| Tony Ramos
|style="font-size:88%"|7–2
|style="font-size:88%" rowspan=6|June 9–10, 2017
|style="font-size:88%" rowspan=2|2017 US World Team Trials
|style="text-align:left;font-size:88%;" rowspan=6|
 Lincoln, Nebraska
|-
|Win
|12–1
|align=left| Tony Ramos
|style="font-size:88%"|4–3
|-
|Win
|11–1
|align=left| Nathan Tomasello
|style="font-size:88%"|6–2
|style="font-size:88%" rowspan=4|2017 US World Team Trials Challenge
|-
|Win
|10–1
|align=left| Nico Megaludis
|style="font-size:88%"|TF 10–0
|-
|Win
|9–1
|align=left| Tyler Graff
|style="font-size:88%"|1–1
|-
|Win
|8–1
|align=left| Darian Cruz
|style="font-size:88%"|9–0
|-
! style=background:white colspan=7 |
|-
|Win
|7–1
|align=left| Daniel Deshazer
|style="font-size:88%"|7–6
|style="font-size:88%" rowspan=2|May 19–22, 2017
|style="font-size:88%" rowspan=2|2017 US Last Chance World Team Trials Qualifier
|style="text-align:left;font-size:88%;" rowspan=2|
 Rochester, Minnesota
|-
|Win
|6–1
|align=left| David Terao
|style="font-size:88%"|9–4
|-
! style=background:white colspan=7 |
|-
|Win
|5–1
|align=left| Evan Silver
|style="font-size:88%"|4–2
|style="font-size:88%" rowspan=6|May 24–26, 2013
|style="font-size:88%" rowspan=6|2013 US University National Championships
|style="text-align:left;font-size:88%;" rowspan=6|
 Akron, Ohio
|-
|Win
|4–1
|align=left| Dominique Price
|style="font-size:88%"|TF 10–0
|-
|Loss
|3–1
|align=left| Nico Megaludis
|style="font-size:88%"|0–3
|-
|Win
|3–0
|align=left| Dylan Peters
|style="font-size:88%"|8–4
|-
|Win
|2–0
|align=left| Max Soria
|style="font-size:88%"|Fall
|-
|Win
|1–0
|align=left| Drake Swarm
|style="font-size:88%"|TF 10–0
|-

References

External links
 
 
 
 

1994 births
Living people
American male sport wrestlers
World Wrestling Championships medalists
Olympic wrestlers of the United States
Olympic bronze medalists for the United States in wrestling
Wrestlers at the 2020 Summer Olympics
Medalists at the 2020 Summer Olympics
20th-century American people
21st-century American people
World Wrestling Champions